Arazin may refer to:
 Ərəzin, Azerbaijan
 Arazin, Iran